Emil Kolben (1 November 1862 in Strančice – 3 September 1943 in Terezín) was an engineer and entrepreneur from Bohemia. The large engineering company ČKD bears his name. He died in the Theresienstadt concentration camp.

Biography
Kolben was born into the German-speaking Jewish family of a small shopkeeper in the village of Strančice, southeast from Prague. He had nine siblings and from the age of 15 he was left to care for himself. After completing his secondary education in Prague, Kolben studied there at the German Technical University. After finishing university he obtained a two-year Gerstner's stipend that allowed him to study abroad. In 1887 he traveled to Zürich, Paris and London and in April 1888 he sailed with his wife Malvinus to the United States, where he stayed for five years. After arriving in New York he set off on further study trips traveling across the country. He obtained a position as an engineer at the Edison Machine Works in Schenectady, then as an assistant of Thomas Edison in Orange, New Jersey and finally as the chief-engineer in Edison's laboratories. In 1889 he visited the laboratory of Nikola Tesla to learn about the poly-phase alternating current motors and power system the inventor was developing there.

In 1892 Kolben returned to Europe and for two years worked as the chief-designer in Switzerland for company Oerlikon which manufactured poly-phase alternating current generators. In 1896 he returned to Bohemia and, in the same year, set up a company  named "Kolben a spol." in Vysočany, an industrial district of Prague. A 60 kW alternator was the first system constructed. With secured financial investment from a bank the company became a stock holding company in 1898. In 1899 it was renamed to "Elektrotechnická a. s.". In 1911 Kolben invited Edison to visit Prague.

The company produced large electrotechnical systems such as hydro-electric power stations, locomotives and machines. Used technologies and equipment were much above standards of the time – for example instead of using a centralized power source and mechanical transmitters the machines were fitted with electrical engines.

In 1921 the company merged with another engineering company "Českomoravská strojírna" into "Českomoravská-Kolben a. s.". In 1927 it merged with "A. s. strojírny" (formerly "Breitfeld & Daněk") into "Českomoravská-Kolben-Daněk", the ČKD. Kolben had served as the director until 1939. The company produced a wide array of electrotechnic and engineering systems and also complete industrial plants. ČKD employed up to 15,000 people.

Kolben also founded two other companies: "Pražská továrna na káble" in Prague-Hostivař (power cables) and "Pražská elektroinstalační společnost" in Prague-Hloubětín (wiring systems). He published dozens of articles, mostly about electrotechnic and engineering.

Immediately after the occupation of Czechoslovakia by the Nazis (1939) Kolben was recalled from his position as the director (March 16) and later imprisoned in the concentration camp Theresienstadt. He died there abandoned and exhausted. Almost all members of his family were imprisoned; 26 of them were killed by the Germans. His grandson Jindřich (b. 1926) survived.

ČKD was heavily damaged during the last days of World War II. It later employed up to 50,000 people and was known mainly for locomotives and trams. Mismanagement during the new free-market era (1990s) and technological delay accumulated during previous decades resulted in bankruptcy in 1998 and a massive reduction in production.

References

 
 Martin Kvítek: "Průkopníci vědy a techniky v českých zemích" (Pioneers of science and technology in Czech lands), 2003, 
 
 
 Jaroslava Hofmannová: "Emil Kolben a založení Kolbenky" (Emil Kolben and establishment of the “Kolbenka” works) /97:3:169/, journal "History of Sciences and Technology" (DVT), Prague

Exhibition, Film, Radio
 The Kolben Family Story Prague, The Jewish Museum: Robert Guttmann Gallery, Prague 1, U Staré školy 3. From February 15 until April 15, 2007, open daily 9 a.m. – 4.30 p.m. except Saturdays and Jewish holidays.  Exhibition curator: Dr. Arno Pařík
 Lampa Film Production, Prague, intends to make a film about Emil Kolben, contact: V. Hamáčková, Jewish Museum 
 The short-lived legacy of industrial giant Emil Kolben - Radio Prague   (by Dita Asiedu) 
 Familie Kolben: Eine Industriellenfamilie im Strudel der Zeit - 24-02-2007 - Radio Prag (German, by Andreas Wiedemann)

Legacy and honors
 The Prague Metro station Kolbenova is named after him.

External links
 Short biography 
 Biography of Kolben and his grandson Jindřich 

1862 births
1943 deaths
People from Prague-East District
People from the Kingdom of Bohemia
Czechoslovak engineers
Czechoslovak businesspeople
Czech people who died in the Theresienstadt Ghetto